The Tapti River (or Tapi) is a river in central India located to the south of the Narmada river that flows westwards before draining into the Arabian Sea. It flows through Surat, and is crossed by the Magdalla, ONGC Bridge.

On 7 August 1968, before the construction of the Ukai Dam to bring its waters under control and provide hydroelectric power, the Tapti River overflowed its banks during heavy rains during the monsoon season. More than 1,000 people drowned in the flood, and the city of Surat was submerged beneath 10 feet of water for several days. After the floodwaters receded, at least 1,000 more people died in Gujarat during a cholera epidemic from the contamination of the drinking water. Its basin covers the parts of Madhya Pradesh, Gujarat and Maharashtra.

Course 
It is the second largest west flowing river in India, after the Narmada River. The Tapti travels east to west and flows though the Indian states of Maharashtra, Gujarat and Madhya Pradesh. It drains into the Gulf of Khambhat, in the Arabian Sea, in Gujarat. The Tapti River has 14 major tributaries, four are right bank and ten are left bank tributaries. The right bank tributaries originate in the Satpura ranges and include Vaki, Aner, Arunawati, and Gomai. The left bank tributaries include Nesu, Amravati, Buray, Panjhara, Bori, Girna, Waghur, Purna, Mona, and Sipna. They originate in the Gawilgarh hills, Ajanta hills, the Western Ghats, and Satmalas.

Etymology
The river is supposedly named after the goddess Tapati, the daughter of Surya, the Sun god and Chhaya. Tapati is the sister of Shani, Bhadra, Yamuna and Yama.

See also
 Gulf of Khambhat

References

External links

 
Rivers of Maharashtra
Rivers of Madhya Pradesh
Rivers of Gujarat
Gulf of Khambhat
Rivers of India
Geography of Surat